Pinneberg station is a railway station on the Hamburg-Altona–Kiel line and located in Pinneberg, Germany, and served by the city trains and regional trains. It is a terminus for the rapid transit trains of the line S3 of the Hamburg S-Bahn.

Station layout
The station is at-grade and has two exits, the main exit with a bus stop and a taxicab stand. The second exit is to the park and ride facility, this exit is through a pedestrian underpass and has no lift. The railway station has a long island platform with the tracks 4 and 5 for the regional trains. Track 1 and track 2 have side platforms for the suburban or city trains. The platform between 2 and 3 is used as an interchange of the S-Bahn and the regional rail towards Neumünster.

Station services

Regional trains
The regional line R70 and R60 from Hamburg central station and Hamburg-Altona railway station respectively toward Neumünster, Kiel or Itzehoe and Husum call the station frequently. Trains at track 5 are toward Hamburg, at track 4 toward Itzehoe and Husum. Track three is used by trains in the direction Neumünster and Kiel.

Hamburg S-Bahn
The tracks 1 and 2 are used by the S3 line of the Hamburg S-Bahn as a terminus. Toward Stade the trains need 96 minutes, reaching Hamburg central station in 39 minutes.

Buses
Several bus lines connect the nearby municipalities with the railway.

Facilities at the station 
The station is managed by the DB Station&Service plc. There are ticket machines for the transport association of Hamburg and the German railway company. The station building is open only on weekdays. About 390 park and ride places and 490 bicycle stands can be used. A small shop for newspapers and fast food snack stands are located at the station. Like many other stations the station is controlled with a video surveillance system.

References

External links

Hamburg S-Bahn stations in Schleswig-Holstein
Railway stations in Schleswig-Holstein
Railway stations in Germany opened in 1844
Buildings and structures completed in 1848
Buildings and structures in Pinneberg (district)